The 2001 NCAA Division I Outdoor Track and Field Championships were contested at the 80th annual NCAA-sanctioned track meet to determine the individual and team champions of men's and women's Division I collegiate track and field in the United States.

This year's championships, the 20th event for both men and women, were held May 30–June 2, 2001 at Hayward Field at the University of Oregon in Eugene, Oregon.

Tennessee won the men's title, finishing one point ahead of TCU in the cumulative standings.

USC won the women's title, nine points ahead of rivals UCLA.

Team results 
 Note: Top 10 only
 (H) = Hosts
Full results

Men's standings

Women's standings

References

NCAA Men's Outdoor Track and Field Championship
NCAA Division I Outdoor Track And Field Championships
NCAA Division I Outdoor Track And Field Championships
NCAA Division I Outdoor Track and Field Championships
NCAA Division I Outdoor Track and Field Championships
NCAA Women's Outdoor Track and Field Championship